Evan Lloyd (6 June 1871 – 28 February 1951) was a Welsh international rugby union wing who played club rugby for Llanelli and international rugby for Wales.

Rugby career
Lloyd played in only one international match in his rugby career, an away encounter to Scotland as part of the 1895 Home Nations Championship. Lloyd was brought in on the wing, opposite Tom Pearson, as a temporary replacement for William Llewellyn Thomas. Under the captaincy of Arthur 'Monkey' Gould, Wales played a good game on a pitch shortened by 20 yards due to a large area of the pitch being frozen. The game finished 5-4 to Scotland, with Wales having a late try disallowed when Frank Mills' score was deemed to have been passed the taped off area. The next game, Thomas returned to the wing position and Lloyd was not selected to represent Wales again.

International matches played
Wales
  1895

Bibliography

References

1871 births
1951 deaths
Welsh rugby union players
Rugby union wings
Rugby union players from Llanelli
Llanelli RFC players
Wales international rugby union players